Iona Thomas  is a British diplomat who serves as the British High Commissioner to New Zealand, and the Governor of Pitcairn.

Thomas did a bachelor’s in literae humaniores at Oxford University and a masters in economics at the London School of Economics.

In August 2022 Thomas took up the position of British High Commissioner to New Zealand, succeeding Laura Clarke. She was Political Counsellor at the British High Commission in Pakistan, and has served in diplomatic posts in Tripoli and at the United Nations in New York. Before joining the Foreign and Commonwealth Office she held posts in the civil service.

In June 2018 Thomas was appointed Officer of the Order of the British Empire for services to British foreign policy.

References

Living people
Year of birth missing (living people)
21st-century British diplomats
British women ambassadors
High Commissioners of the United Kingdom to New Zealand
Governors of Pitcairn
Officers of the Order of the British Empire